Coxs Creek is an unincorporated community along U.S. Routes 31E/150 (known locally as Louisville Road) in Nelson County, Kentucky, United States, 4½ miles north of the county seat of Bardstown.  It is named for Colonel Isaac Cox of Pennsylvania, who built a "fort" (actually an "old time block house") at the site in April 1775 before he fought in the American Revolutionary War, with the help of his brother James. The land had actually been his father's (David Cox), but David moved back to Virginia before he developed it.  More of a station, Cox's  was said to be the first pioneer station in Nelson County. Isaac Cox would later be the last white man to be killed by Indians during the time of the great Indian wars in what later became Kentucky.

Kentucky's second Baptist association was formed at Coxs Creek on October 29, 1785.  The first post office in the community was established on November 28, 1856, with a descendant of Isaac Cox, John C. Cox, the first postmaster. By the time of the automobiles, the post office and adjacent store blocked the view of upcoming traffic on US-31, forcing the Kentucky Highway Department to order the post office moved from Coxs Creek's crossroads of US-31E/US-150 and Kentucky State Route 509 in the 1960s; the new post office is 1/2 mile south of the crossroads.

The nearby creek is called Coxs Creek, and is a tributary of Kentucky's Salt River. It has one school: Cox's Creek Elementary School. Its latitude/longitude is 37.899N and 85.474W. The ZIP Code for Coxs Creek is 40013.

References

Bibliography

Unincorporated communities in Nelson County, Kentucky
Unincorporated communities in Kentucky
Louisville metropolitan area